Middleton Field  is a public-use airport located  west of the central business district of Evergreen, a city in Conecuh County, Alabama, United States. According to the FAA's National Plan of Integrated Airport Systems for 2009–2013, it is categorized as a general aviation facility. Although the airport is owned by the City of Evergreen, it is primarily used for flight training by the U.S. Navy as Naval Outlying Field Evergreen.

Although most U.S. airports use the same three-letter location identifier for the FAA and IATA, Middleton Field is assigned GZH by the FAA but has no designation from the IATA.

Facilities and aircraft 

For the 12-month period ending June 25, 2007, the airport had 134,005 aircraft operations, an average of 367 per day: 96% military and 4% general aviation.

Accidents 
On July 13, 1982, Lt. Cmdr. Barbara Allen Rainey, the U.S. Navy's first female pilot, and her student were killed in a crash while practicing touch-and-go landings at Middleton Field.

References

External links 
 Airfield photos for GZH from Civil Air Patrol
 

Airports in Alabama
Buildings and structures in Conecuh County, Alabama
Transportation in Conecuh County, Alabama